Ľubor Kresák (23 August 1927 in Topoľčany – 20 January 1994 in Bratislava) was a Slovak astronomer.

He discovered two comets: the periodic comet 41P/Tuttle-Giacobini-Kresak and the non-periodic C/1954 M2 (Kresak-Peltier).
He also suggested in 1978 that the Tunguska event was a fragment of the periodic comet Encke.

The asteroid 1849 Kresák was named in his honor.

His wife Margita Kresáková was also an astronomer.

References

External links
 Publications by Ľ. Kresák in Astrophysics Data System

1927 births
1994 deaths
Czechoslovak astronomers
People from Topoľčany